Paul Gagnon (born 17 September 1937) was a Progressive Conservative member of the House of Commons of Canada.

Born in Moose Jaw, Saskatchewan, Gagnon was an engineer and geologist by career. Gagnon was elected at the Calgary North electoral district in the 1984 federal election, thus serving as a backbench supporter of Prime Minister Brian Mulroney's government in the 33rd Canadian Parliament. He left federal politics after this term and did not campaign in the 1988 federal election.

External links
 

1937 births
Living people
Members of the House of Commons of Canada from Alberta
People from Moose Jaw
Progressive Conservative Party of Canada MPs